Esterom is an investigational drug being studied as a topical analgesic.  Chemically, it is a mixture of compounds derived from the esterification of cocaine in propylene glycol.  While the major component is benzoylecgonine, the analgesic activity is likely to due to hydroxypropyl benzoylecgonine, the only component that penetrates the skin.

References 

Analgesics
Tropanes